Peace and Love is the fourth studio album by The Pogues, released in July 1989.

Overview
Peace and Love continued the band's gradual departure from traditional Irish music. It noticeably opens with a heavily jazz-influenced track. Also, several of the songs are inspired by the city in which the Pogues were founded, London ("White City", "Misty Morning, Albert Bridge", "London You're a Lady"), as opposed to Ireland, from which they had usually drawn inspiration.  Nevertheless, several notable Irish personages are mentioned, including Ned of the Hill, Christy Brown, whose book Down All The Days appears as a song title, and Napper Tandy, mentioned in the first line of "Boat Train", which was adapted from a line in the Irish rebel song "The Wearing of the Green". Likewise the MacGowan song "Cotton Fields" draws on the Lead Belly song of the same name.

Critical reception

Mark Deming of AllMusic said that Peace and Love "isn't as good as the two Pogues albums that preceded it", but felt that "it does make clear that MacGowan was hardly the only talented songwriter in the band". Robert Christgau, on the other hand, believed that "Shane MacGowan will remain the only Pogue in the down-and-out hall of fame".

Track listing

Standard edition
"Gridlock" (Jem Finer, Andrew Ranken) – 3:33
"White City" (Shane MacGowan) – 2:31
"Young Ned of the Hill" (Terry Woods, Ron Kavana) – 2:45
"Misty Morning, Albert Bridge" (Finer) – 3:01
"Cotton Fields" (MacGowan) – 2:51
"Blue Heaven" (Phil Chevron, Darryl Hunt) – 3:36
"Down All the Days" (MacGowan) – 3:45
"USA" (MacGowan) – 4:52
"Lorelei" (Chevron) – 3:33
"Gartloney Rats" (Woods) – 2:32
"Boat Train" (MacGowan) – 2:40
"Tombstone" (Finer) – 2:57
"Night Train to Lorca" (Finer) – 3:29
"London You're a Lady" (MacGowan) – 2:56

Bonus tracks (2005 reissue)
"Star of the County Down" (Traditional) (B-side to "White City" 12") – 2:33
"The Limerick Rake" (Traditional) (B-side to "Yeah Yeah Yeah Yeah Yeah") – 3:12
"Train of Love" (Finer) (B-side to "Misty Morning, Albert Bridge" CD single) – 3:08
"Everyman Is a King" (Woods, Kavana) (B-side to "White City") – 3:54
"Yeah Yeah Yeah Yeah Yeah" (MacGowan) (A-side single) – 3:19
"Honky Tonk Women" (Mick Jagger, Keith Richards) (B-side to "Yeah Yeah Yeah Yeah Yeah" 12") – 2:55

Certifications

Personnel

The Pogues
Shane MacGowan - vocals
Jem Finer - banjo
Spider Stacy - tin whistle
James Fearnley - accordion
Andrew Ranken - drums
Terry Woods - cittern, mandolin
Philip Chevron - guitar
Darryl Hunt - bass guitar

Additional musicians
Credits are adapted from the album liner notes, except where noted.

Peadar O'Riada - string arrangement on "London You're a Lady" 
Fiachra Trench - string and brass arrangement on "Misty Morning, Albert Bridge" 
Paul Taylor - brass arrangement on "Blue Heaven" and "Night Train to Lorca" 
Brian Clarke - alto saxophone
Joey Cashman - tenor saxophone 
Eli Thompson - trumpet
Paul Taylor - trombone
Rick Trevan - tenor saxophone on "Gridlock"
Gasper Lawal - percussion on "Blue Heaven" and "Tombstone"
Kirsty McColl - backup vocals on "Lorelei"
John Sheahan - fiddle on "The Limerick Rake"

Technical
Steve Lillywhite - producer
Chris Dickie - engineer
Nick Lacey - assistant engineer
Ryan Art - design
Philip Hardaker - inner sleeve montage
Steve Pyke - band photography
David Jordan - producer on "Star of the County Down" 
Paul Scully - producer on "Star of the County Down"

Additional information
The album carried a dedication to "the memory of the 95 people who died at Hillsborough Football Ground". The reason for this apparent anomaly is that at the time of the album's release the disaster's eventual 96th victim Tony Bland was still being kept alive on life support at Airedale General Hospital in Keighley, West Yorkshire where he would eventually die on 3 March 1993.
The boxer on the cover has six fingers on his right hand. The boxer was British Empire Games, later changed to the Commonwealth Games, bronze winner, Hugh Cameron. The fifth finger was added by sleeve designer, Simon Ryan, to accommodate the word "PEACE". 
The song "Down All The Days" was later covered by noise rock band Steel Pole Bath Tub on their album The Miracle of Sound in Motion.
The song "Gridlock" is used as the introduction music on The Davey Mac Sports Program.

References

1989 albums
The Pogues albums
Albums produced by Steve Lillywhite
Island Records albums